The Flag of the Department of Putumayo is a flag symbol of the Department of Putumayo, southern Colombia. The flag is a rectangle with horizontal tricolored stripes. The green stripe symbolizes the jungles that cover almost entirely the Department of Putumayo. The white stripe symbolizes the peaceful character of the people from Putumayo. The black stripe symbolizes oil, the main economic resource in Putumayo.

The flag is similar to the flag of the Spanish region of Extremadura and some of the historical flags of Afghanistan.

References
Putumayenses.com; Flag of Putumayo  

Flags of the departments of Colombia
Putumayo Department